Élisabeth Garouste (born 17 July 1946) is a French interior designer.

In 1970, she married painter Gérard Garouste.

Garouste designed theatre sets for Jean-Michel Ribes.

Garouste also has collaborated with other designers such as Christian Lacroix and Nina Ricci and designs glassware and wallpaper.

External links
Mobilier national collection

References 

1946 births
Living people
French interior designers